Nemalion  is a genus of red algae that contains approximately ten species, including N. helminthoides. Its members are known by a number of common names. It is the source of the subclass name "Nemaliophycidae".

Species 

As of 2017, the species accepted taxonomically are:
Nemalion amoenum
Nemalion attenuatum
Nemalion cari-cariense
Nemalion helminthoides
Nemalion longicolle
Nemalion lubricum (type species)
Nemalion multifidum
Nemalion multifidum subsp. monoicum
Nemalion perpusillum
Nemalion vermiculare

Description
Simple multiaxial frond, with a soft and gelatinous core.

Distribution

Habitat
Marine, mainly littoral.

Notes

References

Further reading
 Fritsch, F.E. 1965. The Structure and Reproduction of the Algae. pp. 468 - 469 Cambridge University Press
 Nicolson, D.H. & Norris, J.N. (1983). Ordinal orthography: Nemalionales vs. Nemaliales (Rhodophyta). Taxon 32: 288–292.

Red algae genera